Eibusu Yaohanbiyu (English: Let Me Join You) is a 2015 Indian Meitei language film directed by Maipaksana Haorongbam and produced by Yumnam Hitalar (Neta) Singh, under the banner of Living Art, Chajing Productions. It is co-produced by Th. Sudhir Meetei and Oinam Inakhunbi Devi.  The film won the National Film Award for Best Feature Film in Manipuri at the 63rd National Film Awards. It was officially selected for International Competition at 20th International Children's Film Festival, India (ICFFI). It also got selection at the 4th Brahmaputra Valley Film Festival 2016 and Habitat Film Festival 2016.

Synopsis
The film is about the victory of a differently-abled boy's attempt to join a football team. The story revolves around a football loving physically challenged school boy and his determination to take part in his school football team. He faces discrimination but ended up scoring the winning goal in the last moments when he replaced an injured team mate in the interschool championship final.

Cast
 Thounaojam Khelemba Meetei
 Ningthouja Jayvidya
 Ingocha
 Ayekpam Shanti
 Reena
 Phiroj
 H. Pradip Singh
 Y. Lopesh Singh
 Thounaojam Rabina Chanu
 Thounaojam Sanatombi Chanu

Accolades
The film won the Best Regional Feature Film in Manipuri Language in the 63rd National Film Awards held in 2016. The citation for the National Award reads, "A moving film about the victory of a differently-abled boy’s attempt to join a football team".

Maipaksana Haorongbam won the Best Direction award at the 10th edition of the Manipur State Film Awards 2015-16.

References

2010s Meitei-language films
2015 films